Jet-Set was a Colombian-based fortnightly magazine profiling the glamorous, compelling and sometimes scandalous lives and happenings of Colombian and international celebrities, politicians, artists, and those of the elite and high-society, that is to say, those in the jet set. The magazine heavily relies on engaging editorials and vivid photographs depicting the stylish fashions worn, the exciting events attended, and the extravagant home décor of the rich and famous to captivate its readers' imagination.

History and operations
The magazine was founded in 1998 as the tenth publication of Publicaciones Semana S.A. with Álvaro García Jiménez as its first editor-in-chief.

The magazine is based in Bogotá, D.C.

See also

 Lists of magazines
 Media of Colombia

 ¡Hola!

References

External links
 , the magazine's official website
 Jetset Term, on Instagram

1998 establishments in Colombia
Celebrity magazines
Magazines published in Colombia
Biweekly magazines
Magazines established in 1998
Mass media in Bogotá
Spanish-language magazines